"Body in Motion" (stylized in all caps) is a song by American record producer DJ Khaled, featuring guest vocals from American singer Bryson Tiller and American rappers Lil Baby and Roddy Ricch. The song was serviced to US rhythmic radio on September 14, 2021, as the fifth single from Khaled's twelfth studio album, Khaled Khaled. Produced by Khaled, StreetRunner, and Tarik Azzouz, the four artists wrote the song alongside Kevin Cossom.

Background
Prior to the album's release, DJ Khaled shared his thoughts on collaborating with Roddy Ricch for "Body in Motion": "He's a young icon. When the vocals came in, I lost my mind. We ended up making something incredible". On August 23, 2021, Khaled announced that the song would be sent to radio soon to serve as the next single from his Khaled Khaled album.

Critical reception
Luke Morgan Britton from NME praised Lil Baby's appearances on Khaled Khaled, writing: "Lil Baby shows why he's one of the most effortless rappers right now with standout features on the trappy 'Every Chance I Get' and R&B smoothy 'Body In Motion'".

Music video
The music video for the song was released on May 18, 2021. It was filmed in Miami, Florida, where Khaled resides. The video sees all artists on a yacht, surrounded by semi-nude women in bikinis and bathing suits. Khaled's longtime friend, American rapper Fat Joe, makes a cameo appearance. The video was released to celebrate the song's parent album, Khaled Khaled, being certified gold by the Recording Industry Association of America (RIAA) the day before.

Charts

Release history

References

 

 
2021 singles
2021 songs
DJ Khaled songs
Bryson Tiller songs
Lil Baby songs
Roddy Ricch songs
Songs written by DJ Khaled
Songs written by Bryson Tiller
Songs written by Lil Baby
Songs written by Roddy Ricch
Songs written by Kevin Cossom